This is a list of notable restaurant chains in Australia. A restaurant chain is a set of related restaurants with the same name in many different locations that are either under shared corporate ownership (e.g., McDonald's in the U.S.) or franchising agreements. Typically, the restaurants within a chain are built to a standard format through architectural prototype development and offer a standard menu and/or services.

Restaurant chains in Australia

See also

 List of companies of Australia
 List of fast food restaurant chains
 List of pizzerias in Australia
 List of restaurant chains
 Lists of restaurants
 Outline of Australia

References

External links
 

 
Australia
Australia restaurant
Lists of companies of Australia
Australian cuisine-related lists
Restaurants in Australia